Houat is a French island off the south coast of Brittany in the department of Morbihan. It is located, along with two other major islands, in the entrance to the Baie de Quiberon. Its "twin sister" island is Hoëdic.

Administratively, Île-d'Houat is a commune of the Morbihan department.

Geography
 long,  at the widest. The island is mostly granite cliffs except for a long beach lined with dunes on the eastern coast.

Demographics
Inhabitants of Île-d'Houat are called Houatais.

Miscellaneous
Houat is the setting for Iain Pears' 2005 novel The Portrait.

See also
Communes of the Morbihan department

References

External links

Islands of Brittany
Communes of Morbihan
Islands of the Bay of Biscay